WIOD (610 AM) is a commercial news/talk radio station licensed to Miami, Florida, serving the Miami metropolitan area and much of surrounding South Florida. Owned by iHeartMedia, WIOD serves as the Miami affiliate for ABC News Radio, The Glenn Beck Program, The Sean Hannity Show, The Schnitt Show and Coast to Coast AM, and syndicated personalities Clyde Lewis and Bill Cunningham. The WIOD studios are located in the Hollywood, FL suburb of Miramar, and the station transmitter is in nearby North Bay Village. Besides its main analog transmission, WIOD simulcasts over the HD subchannel of co-owned WBGG-FM, and streams online via iHeartRadio.

Usually transmitting full-time with 5,000 watts, WIOD is one of many AM stations in the region that operate with increased power via special temporary authority from the Federal Communications Commission (FCC), because of interference from Cuban radio stations intentionally overriding their signals.

History
Experimental broadcasts began in the spring of 1925 by Carl Graham Fisher, a Miami Beach developer.  The station formally signed on the air on January 19, 1926. Carl Fisher selected WIOD as the call sign, signifying the "Wonderful Isle of Dreams" to commemorate Collins Island, on which the station's studios and offices were situated.  WIOD is Florida's seventh-oldest continuously licensed broadcast radio station.

From 1959 to 1962 the call letters were changed to WCKR (for Cox-Knight Broadcasting, which also owned television station WCKT, now WSVN). Branded Wacker Radio, it broadcast middle of the road music, but offered Top 40 hits at night, featuring noted South Florida disc jockey Rick Shaw.  WIOD also carried NBC Radio's "Monitor" program on weekends. To accommodate WCKT, a new addition housing television studios was built on the artificial Broadcast Key in North Bay Village.

On June 16, 1981, WIOD began operating with 10,000 watts day and night to overcome interference caused by a high-power station in Cuba. This special temporary authority, granted by the FCC, has been renewed on a regular basis since then.

On April 6, 2017, WIOD filed an application for an FCC construction permit to move to a new transmitter site, increase day power to 50,000 watts and increase night power to 20,000 watts. It was accepted for filing the following day,  but iHeartMedia has not built the new facility yet.

WIOD has been a frequent winner in annual Florida Associated Press statewide competitions. WIOD may be best known for its continuous storm coverage, particularly during Hurricane Andrew, Hurricane Katrina and Hurricane Wilma.

WIOD was the radio flagship station of the 2006 NBA champions Miami Heat basketball team from 1996 until 2008. From 1966 until 2001 it was the radio flagship of the Miami Dolphins football team, the longest partnership between a Miami sports team and a radio flagship station.  It also was the Florida Panthers' original flagship station from 1993 until 2003. Currently WIOD is the official broadcast emergency station for the Broward County Commission.

From April 2010 to March 2014 WIOD had been simulcast on FM translator W262AN at 100.3 MHz. That frequency is now used by a low-power FM station, WQNB.  WIOD is also heard on the WBGG-FM 105.9 HD2 subchannel.

Former personalities
WIOD's former hosts include Larry King, Neil Rogers, Sally Jessy Raphael, Ron Bennington, Mike Reineri, Bill Calder, Alan Burke, Sandy Peyton, Rick and Suds, Hank Goldberg, Ed Berliner, Randi Rhodes, Big Wilson, Chris Baker, Phil Hendrie, Joey Reynolds, Tom Gauger, Dave LaMont, Tom Leykis, Jack Ellery and Ed Arnold. Former full-time anchors include Mike Woulfe, Lori Shepard, Lauren Pastrana, Patty DeMendoza, Wendi Grossman, Andrew Julian, Ron Hersey, Aron Bender, Randy Lantz, Christina Kautz and John Levitt. Mike Reineri hosted the last music show on WIOD from 6 to 10 a.m. Monday through Friday from 1974 to 1989, until the station switched to a full time talk format.  He was still with WIOD till 1992. Reineri's traffic reporter, Dave Mitchell, hosted the show on Saturday and Sunday mornings in the same time slot. Longtime anchor and News Director Lori Shepard left WIOD in August 2013. Other traffic reporters on WIOD in the 1980s and 1990s and 2003-2007 were Miami radio veterans: Richard Lewis, Joe Brennan, George Sheldon, Teri Griffin and Don Anthony (Dave Agony from the WAXY FM days). Joe Brennan left I-Heart's WIOD in 2018, Don Anthony (aka Don Agony) retired from radio broadcasting in 2009, George Sheldon retired from radio/television broadcasting 1/31/2013 in Asheville, NC, Teri Griffin (retired from broadcasting and has moved out of South Florida), and Trish Anderson (deceased). Since 1989 WIOD has had a news-talk format.

Jingles best remembered at WIOD have included "WIOD/Someplace Special," "The sunshine machine is coming your way/WIOD", "Mike Reineri/will get you started and on your way/every morning on WIOD", "Your Hometown Station/WIOD", "Go Dolphins! on WIOD" and "The Miami Heat on WIOD/The Game's On Us/WIOD".  WIOD primarily used TM Productions jingles during the 1970s, mostly resung from KDKA packages.  The station did not have an image song until it had JAM Creative Productions' "First of All" jingle package resung and customized for them in the mid-1980s.  Other JAM jingle series that were reworked to accommodate the six-note WIOD logo include "The Spirit of New England," "New Day," "Superstation" and "New York Fan".  WFAN New York's jingle melody is actually modeled after WIOD's jingle melody and, when WIOD had "New York Fan" resung for them, the station ordered a custom package, "Extra Innings", to accompany the "New York Fan" jingles.  All JAM Creative Productions jingle series used by WIOD remain available from the company.

Programming
Weekdays begin with a morning talk and information drive time show, South Florida's First News with Andrew Colton, followed by Manny Munoz in late mornings. The rest of the weekday schedule is made up of nationally syndicated conservative talk programs, including Rush Limbaugh, Sean Hannity, Glenn Beck, Todd Schnitt, Ground Zero with Clyde Lewis, Coast to Coast AM with George Noory and This Morning, America's First News with Gordon Deal.

Weekends feature Live on Sunday Night, It's Bill Cunningham. WIOD has local news 24 hours a day and traffic reports around the clock every 15 minutes. World and national news is supplied by ABC News Radio. WIOD also has a news and weather sharing agreement with NBC affiliate WTVJ (channel 6).

Controversy
In June 2007 the all-Democratic county commission in Broward County was on the verge of rejecting WIOD as the official station for emergency information because of concerns that it was also home to Rush Limbaugh and other conservative talk show hosts. On his radio show Rush Limbaugh said, "They are politicizing the delivery of emergency news, which is non-partisan." After complaints from around the country the commission decided to keep using the radio station.

References

External links
 
 

1926 establishments in Florida
IHeartMedia radio stations
News and talk radio stations in the United States
Radio stations established in 1926
IOD